The enzyme 3-hydroxybutyryl-CoA dehydratase catalyzes the chemical reaction

(3R)-3-hydroxybutanoyl-CoA  crotonoyl-CoA + H2O

This enzyme belongs to the family of lyases, specifically the hydro-lyases, which cleave carbon-oxygen bonds.  The systematic name of this enzyme class is (3R)-3-hydroxybutanoyl-CoA hydro-lyase (crotonoyl-CoA-forming). Other names in common use include D-3-hydroxybutyryl coenzyme A dehydratase, D-3-hydroxybutyryl-CoA dehydratase, enoyl coenzyme A hydrase (D), and (3R)-3-hydroxybutanoyl-CoA hydro-lyase.  This enzyme participates in butanoate metabolism.

References

 

EC 4.2.1
Enzymes of unknown structure